The list of Kappa Alpha Psi (ΚΑΨ) brothers (commonly referred to as Kappas or Nupes) includes initiated members. The list below includes members recognized as leaders in their respective fields. Kappa Alpha Psi is the only National Pan-Hellenic Council (NPHC) affiliated fraternity to not grant honorary membership.

As of its centennial in 2011, the fraternity was composed of 150,000 college-trained men, with undergraduate chapters located on more than 360 college and university campuses and alumni chapters in more than 340 cities in the United States and five foreign countries. The fraternity's Constitution has never contained any clause which either excluded or suggested the exclusion of a man from membership merely because of his color, creed, or national origin, though membership has traditionally been dominated by those of African heritage.

Kappa Alpha Psi was founded on January 5, 1911 at Indiana University Bloomington in Bloomington, Indiana. The campus of Indiana University at that time did not encourage the assimilation of Blacks. Kappa Alpha Psi is the second oldest existing collegiate historically Black Greek letter organization and the first intercollegiate fraternity incorporated as a national body. Kelvin Kirk

Academia

Arts & Entertainment

Film, television and theatre

Journalism and Commentary

Music

Business

Government and Politics

Law

Literature

Military

Religion

Science & Medicine

(US Navy's National Naval Dental School, Bethesda, Maryland, McGill University Faculty of Dentistry, Montreal, Quebec Canada, Charter member of Epsilon Lambda and Canada Alumni Chapter of Kappa Alpha Psi. American Academy of Oral Medicine The Ameriacn Academy of Oral Medicine 2105 107th Street, Suite 205
Seattle, Washington 98133.

Athletics

Baseball

Basketball

American Football

Track & Field

Soccer, Tennis, and Other Athletics

References

Kappa Alpha Psi
Lists of members of United States student societies